Fermanagh  may refer to:

 County Fermanagh, one of the six counties of Northern Ireland
 Fermanagh (Parliament of Ireland constituency) until 1800
 Fermanagh (UK Parliament constituency) 1801–85
 Fermanagh GAA, intercounty tem
 Fermanagh District Council, one of the 26 district councils of Northern Ireland, covering a slightly larger area than the county
 Fermanagh Township, Juniata County, Pennsylvania, USA
 Viscount Fermanagh junior title of Earl Verney
 Baron Fermanagh junior title of Earl Erne